Walter Greene is an American multihull sailboat designer and builder.

Boats designed
Partial list.
Acapella (later renamed Olympus Photo) (1978)

Boats built
Partial list.
Moxie (1980)

References

External links
Greene Marine

Multihull designers
American yacht designers
Year of birth missing (living people)
Living people